Myburgh is a surname. Notable people with the surname include:

Alexander Myburgh (1848–1889), South African barrister, chairman of the Shanghai Municipal Council 1883–1884
Alwyn Myburgh (born 1980), South African hurdler
Brian Myburgh (born 1973), South African former field hockey player who competed in the 1996 Summer Olympics
Claude Myburgh (1911–1987), English cricketer and British Army officer
Geoff Myburgh (1928–2010), South African Olympic sailor and one of the founders of the NSRI
Jeanette Myburgh (born 1940), South African former swimmer who competed in the 1956 Summer Olympics
Johann Myburgh (born 1980), former South African cricketer
Natalie Myburgh (1940–2014), South African swimmer
Pieter Myburgh (born 1986), South African rugby union footballer
Pieter-Louis Myburgh, South African investigative journalist
Stephan Myburgh (born 1984), Dutch cricketer of South African origin
Tertius Myburgh (1936–1990), South African journalist and editor of the Sunday Times between 1975 and 1990
Wessel Myburgh (born 1990), Namibian cricketer

See also
Maryburgh